Oued El Djemaa (River of the Friday market in Arabic ) is a town and commune in Relizane Province, Algeria.

References

Communes of Relizane Province